On 28 June 2021, President Biden directed airstrikes against Iran-backed militia groups close to the Syria-Iraq border. F-15E and F-16 aircraft were used to launch the attack in what the U.S. described as a retaliatory attack against U.S. facilities and personnel in Iraq by militia groups. Two operational and weapons storage facilities were targeted in Syria, the U.S. military revealed in a statement. Despite the U.S. not disclosing the information regarding the casualties in the attack, the SOHR stated that at least nine Iran-backed Iraqi militia fighters died, leaving many others injured. Iraqi militia groups aligned with Iran in a statement named four members of the Kataib Sayyed al-Shuhada faction they said were killed in the attack on the Syria-Iraq border.

Reaction
Iraqi Prime Minister Mustafa Al-Kadhimi condemned the air attack as a "blatant and unacceptable violation of Iraqi sovereignty and Iraqi national security". Meanwhile, Syrian state media (SANA) reported that an air missile attack after midnight on residential houses in the countryside of Abu Kamal, presumably by American warplanes, killed a child and injured three civilians.

Aftermath
Hours later, U.S. forces in Syria came under fire, following the U.S. strikes on the Syria-Iraqi border. Pro-Iranian militias fired rockets at the American base at Al-Omar Oilfield in Syria in response to U.S. airstrikes.
The U.S. coalition responded by firing heavy artillery on Iranian-backed Militias Positions around Al-Mayadin. There were no injuries sustained during the attack, the spokesman for Operation Inherent Resolve, Col. Wayne Marotto disclosed.

See also
 List of United States attacks on Syria during the Syrian civil war
 February 2021 United States airstrike in Syria

References

2021 airstrikes
2021 in Iraq
American airstrikes during the Syrian civil war
Attacks in Syria in 2021
Attacks on buildings and structures in 2021
Attacks on buildings and structures in Syria
Attacks on buildings and structures in Iraq
Deir ez-Zor Governorate in the Syrian civil war
June 2021 events in Syria
Military operations of the Syrian civil war in 2021
Iraq–United States relations
Iraq–Syria relations
Iran–United States relations
Syria–United States military relations
Presidency of Joe Biden